The Bhotiya, also called Rongpa (in Uttarakhand ), are located in the trans-Himalayan region of India. Rongpa communities are some of the oldest and native of the upper belt of the Himalayas, close to the border of Tibet in Garhwal. It was once believed that the Rongpa community had been wiped out.

Anthropological evidence suggests that the word "Rongpa" translates to "valley people". An alternative translation proposes that 'Rong' refers to a rigid valley, while 'pa' refers to the commuters. While the Rongpa have their own distinct history, tradition, and customs, they are similar to the Garhwali people.

History 
According to the late Hayat Singh Pal, a recognized influence in Rongpa culture, the people of these valleys are Suryavansi, Chandravansi, Rajputs and Thakars, as described in ancient texts. Marchha, Tolchha, and Jadhs are the three sub-groups of the bhotiya (Rongpa )community in Uttarakhand. The Marchha inhabit the Niti and Mana valleys the Tolcha the Niti valley and before 1962 war, Jadhs resided in the Nelong and Jadung valleys in the Uttarkashi district of Garhwal.

The Jadh sub-group, in particular, are among the warrior clans(Kshatriya), as they were the ruler of the Gartang Garh, one of the 52  (forts) of the Garhwal Kingdom. Jadhs now reside in the Bagori , Ganeshpur and Veerpur villages of Uttarkashi. These villages have a diverse population consisting of upper caste Jadhs, Fias (alleged lower caste), Kolis (weavers of Himachal), Khampas (natives of Tibet), Nepalis, and Garhwali’s. Dialect of Jadhs is almost similar to the dialect spoken in villages of Kinnaur district(like kanam, Nesang, Pooh,etc.) of Himachal Pradesh probably due to geographical proximity and cultural ties that still continues. The written and official language of this community is Hindi. All the sub-groups of Rongpas speaks a completely different dialect.

Culture 
The Rongpa community practices strict Hinduism. Hindu Gods and Goddesses are worshipped by the community, in hopes of gaining protection for their families and villages. However, the people of this community mainly worship Lord Shiva, Vishnu and Pandavas, apart from their Isht devs and devis.

Rongpas historically preferred to marry within their own community, though recently inter-community marriage has become common.

Dress 
The traditional dress worn by the people of Bhotia is made with layers of wool, designed to provide warmth during the cold winters.  Women traditionally wear a woolen skirt, shirt, waistcoat, or overcoat. They usually adorn their necks, ears, and noses with beads and rings of gold or silver. The men typically wear trousers over which they layer a loose gown tied to the waist with a cloth, called a patta. They may also don a woollen cap.

See also
Bhotiya
Jad people

References

Tibetan people